G. Fred Galli (May 7, 1902 – January 10, 1967) was an American cheesemaker and politician. He served as a member of the Wisconsin State Assembly in the 1960s.

Early life and career
Galli was born in Corzoneso, Switzerland and attended school in Laupen, Switzerland. He took dairying courses in Berne, Switzerland and at the University of Wisconsin–Madison. He was a cheesemaker and grader in Monroe, Wisconsin, and managed the Cheese Producers Cooperative Association. He was a cheese judge at state fairs and at State Cheesemakers conventions. He served as director of the Monroe Chamber of Commerce and was a charter member and director of the Wisconsin Cheese Foundation.

Political career
Galli served as an alderman from 1952 to 1960 and as president of the Monroe Common Council from 1956 to 1958. In 1964, Galli was elected in a special election as a Republican to the Wisconsin State Assembly to fill the vacancy caused by the death of Christ M. Stauffer. Galli was reelected in 1964 and 1966, and served in the Assembly until his death in 1967.

References

External links
 
 Wisconsin Historical Society

1902 births
1967 deaths
People from Monroe, Wisconsin
University of Wisconsin–Madison College of Agricultural and Life Sciences alumni
Wisconsin city council members
20th-century American politicians
Republican Party members of the Wisconsin State Assembly